Kelela Mizanekristos (born June 6, 1983) is an American singer. She made her debut in the music industry with the release of her 2013 mixtape Cut 4 Me. In 2015, she released Hallucinogen, an EP which deals with the beginning, middle, and end of a relationship in reverse chronological order. Her debut studio album, Take Me Apart, was released in 2017 to critical acclaim.

Early life and education
A second-generation Ethiopian American and an only child, Mizanekristos was born in Washington, D.C. on June 6, 1983. Growing up in Gaithersburg, Maryland, she learned to play the violin in fourth grade and sang in her school's choir. In 2001, she graduated from Magruder High School. After transferring from Montgomery College to the American University, Mizanekristos began singing jazz standards at cafés. In 2008, she joined an indie band called Dizzy Spells and sang progressive metal after meeting Tosin Abasi, whom she later dated. In 2010, she moved to Los Angeles, where she currently lives, in addition to London.

Career

2012–2015: Cut 4 Me and Hallucinogen
In November 2012, Mizanekristos began work on her debut mixtape with already two recorded songs. She later quit her job as a telemarketer to fully pursue her career as a musician. Having moved to Los Angeles, Mizanekristos connected with Teengirl Fantasy and contributed to the group's 2013 album Tracer on the song "EFX", which led her to meet Prince William from the label Fade to Mind. He introduced her to the sound of the record label and its sister imprint from London, Night Slugs. In May 2013, she appeared on Kingdom's "Bank Head", and five months later released her mixtape Cut 4 Me for free. Harriet Gisbone of The Guardian described the mixtape as "an experiment for the production team, the first time the production crew had used vocals on their club tracks." Her track "Go All Night" was included on Saint Heron, a multi-artist compilation album released by Solange Knowles. The mixtape was heavily influenced by grime music, a popular electronic genre based in the UK, and helped revive the subgenre known as Rhythm & Grime.

In December 2013, DJ Kitty Cash released her Love the Free mixtape, which featured her song, "The High". Mizanekristos later released  the track herself on February 4, 2014, on her SoundCloud. She also featured on Bok Bok's song "Melba's Call", which was released on March 5. On March 3, 2015, Mizanekristos announced the release of her first EP, Hallucinogen, alongside the release of the lead single "A Message" and its accompanying music video. The second single, "Rewind", was released on September 2. The EP covers the beginning, middle, and end of a relationship in reverse chronological order. It includes the previously shared "The High".

2016–2018: Take Me Apart

In 2016, Mizanekristos was featured on "A Breath Away" from Clams Casino's 32 Levels, "From the Ground" from Danny Brown's Atrocity Exhibition, and "Scales" from Solange's A Seat at the Table. In February 2017, she took part in Red Bull Sound Select's 3 Days in Miami. Later that year, she was featured on the track "Submission" alongside rapper Danny Brown and provided additional vocals on the track "Busted and Blue" from Gorillaz's album Humanz.

On July 14, 2017, Mizanekristos announced her debut studio album, Take Me Apart. It was made available for pre-order on August 1 alongside the release of the lead single, "LMK". Three more singles preceded the album, "Frontline", "Waitin" and "Blue Light", before it was released on October 6, 2017. The album received widespread acclaim from music critics and featured on various year-end lists. It was also included in the 2018 edition of the book 1001 Albums You Must Hear Before You Die. The music critic Craig Jenkins noted heavy electronic instrumentation on the album with, "deconstructed dubstep wubs in “Blue Light” and used the Roland synth that gave “Jupiter” its name — an instrument famous for its blaring leads — to play sultry chiptune instead."

On June 13, 2018, Mizanekristos was featured on the Girl Unit remix of the song "WYWD", which served as the lead single from his upcoming album, Song Feel. The two have previously worked together on Cut 4 Mes "Floor Show" and Hallucinogens "Rewind".

On September 12, 2018, Mizanekristos announced Take Me a_Part, the Remixes, a remix album consisting of remixes from her debut album, and shared a remix for "LMK" featuring Princess Nokia, Junglepussy, Cupcakke and Ms. Boogie. The album features contributions from Kaytranada, Rare Essence, Serpentwithfeet and more. On September 26, Mizanekristos shared Kaytranada's "Waitin" remix as the second single from the album. The album was released on October 5, 2018, making it a year since the release of Take Me Apart.

2019–present: Hiatus and Raven 
On September 13, 2022, Mizanekristos released "Washed Away", her first single in five years along with a music video.

On November 15, 2022, Mizanekristos announced her second studio album Raven would be released in early 2023. "Happy Ending", "On the Run", "Contact", and “Enough for Love” were also released as singles prior to the release of the album.

On February 10, 2023, Raven was released.  She performed her song “Enough for Love” during a performance on The Tonight Show Starring Jimmy Fallon the same day.

Raven includes collaborators such as Asmara from Fade to Mind’s NGUZUNGUZU, Philly DJ and producer LSDXOXO, German ambient duo OCA, and Toronto DJ BAMBII. The album showcases Black futurist art and electronic music sharing inspiration with Stevie Wonder, Herbie Hancock, and Sun Ra to Janelle Monáe, Solange, Beyoncé, Drexciya and Aaliyah.

Personal life
Kelela openly identifies as queer.

In 2019, the artist made a reading primer that contained essays and literature, podcasts and videos, and documentaries as reference material for her friends, family and business partners. Resources included Reader on Misogynoir by Kandis Williams, The will to change by bell hooks and Algorithms of Oppression by Safiya Umoja Noble; the Seeing White podcast and IGTV videos from Sonya Renee Taylor about Black labour called, Are you stealing from Black folks? and More on Stealing from Black People: Right Relationship Beyond Capitalism; and, The Last Angel of History (1996), which features interviews from the late Octavia E Butler and Greg Tate. The material inspired similar primers created and shared during the George Floyd protests and uprisings in 2020.

Discography

Studio albums

Remix albums

Mixtapes

Extended plays

Singles

Guest appearances

References

External links

1983 births
21st-century American singers
American women singer-songwriters
Ethiopian musicians
American women songwriters
American electronic musicians
American people of Ethiopian descent
American rhythm and blues singer-songwriters
LGBT people from Washington, D.C.
American LGBT singers
American LGBT songwriters
LGBT African Americans
Living people
Warp (record label) artists
American women in electronic music
21st-century American women singers
LGBT people from Maryland
Queer women
Queer singers
Queer songwriters
African-American women musicians
21st-century African-American women singers
20th-century African-American people
20th-century African-American women
Singer-songwriters from Washington, D.C.